Pseudorimus is a genus of broad-nosed weevils in the beetle family Curculionidae. There are at least two described species in Pseudorimus.

Species
These two species belong to the genus Pseudorimus:
 Pseudorimus granicollis Van Dyke, 1934 i c g
 Pseudorimus orbicollis Van Dyke, 1934 i c g b
Data sources: i = ITIS, c = Catalogue of Life, g = GBIF, b = Bugguide.net

References

Further reading

 
 
 
 

Entiminae
Articles created by Qbugbot